The Bronson Windmill is an historic windmill at 3015 Bronson Road in Fairfield, Connecticut.  Built in 1893-94, it is the only surviving windmill in the town, ouf a number that once dotted the landscape.  It was built for Frederic Bronson, owner of the local estate.  The mill was listed on the National Register of Historic Places in 1971.

Description and history
The Bronson Windmill stands on the west side of Bronson Road, opposite the Fairfield Country Day School. Its framing is Georgia pine, and it is anchored to the ground by locust beams set  into the ground, which are fastened to the frame by iron rods. The sides, which telescope inward as the structure rises, are dotted with rectangular window openings. The sides are covered in wooden shingles, and rise to a cornice and domed roof, which is surmounted by a directional wind vane in the shape of a rooster. The blades of the mill are stored within the building. The mill was used to draw water into a cistern located below ground.

The mill was built in 1893-94 for Frederic Bronson to provide water for use on his large dairy farm, and is the only windmill in Fairfield (out of many that once dotted its landscape).  It was built by the Corcoran Storm-Defying Windmills Company of New York City and Jersey City, New Jersey.  Bronson's farm was large enough to require more water than rainfall typically supplied.  Bronson had also built a large three-story estate house, and the mill was apparently scaled to match its grandeur.

See also
National Register of Historic Places listings in Fairfield County, Connecticut

References

External links

Tourist attractions in Fairfield County, Connecticut
Agricultural buildings and structures on the National Register of Historic Places in Connecticut
Historic American Buildings Survey in Connecticut
Windmills completed in 1894
Buildings and structures in Fairfield, Connecticut
National Register of Historic Places in Fairfield County, Connecticut
Wind power in Connecticut
Agricultural buildings and structures in Connecticut
1894 establishments in Connecticut
Windmills on the National Register of Historic Places